The girls' doubles tournament of the 2020 European Junior Badminton Championships was held from 2 to 7 November. Bengisu Erçetin and Nazlıcan İnci from Turkey clinched this title in the last edition.

Seeds
Seeds were announced on 16 October.

 Anastasiia Boiarun / Alena Iakovleva (champions)
 Lucia Rodriguez / Ania Setien (first round)
 Katharina Fink / Yasmine Hamza (second round)
 Julie Franconville / Caroline Racloz (second round)

Draw

Finals

Top half

Section 1

Section 2

Bottom half

Section 3

Section 4

References

External links 
Main Draw

2020 European Junior Badminton Championships